Matthew Watson  is an American YouTuber, comedian, musician, podcast host and music video director. He is best known as a co-host of the comedy-variety channel SuperMega (along with its weekly podcast SuperMegaCast) and a former editor for and member of the Let's Play-orientated web series Game Grumps. Watson has collaborated with several other entertainers, such as Finn Wolfhard, Markiplier, bbno$ and OneyNG. , SuperMega has over 1 million subscribers and over 385 million total video views.

In 2020, Watson released his music debut with his EP, OUCH!. His first full-length album, SEE YOU THERE, was released on November 7, 2022.

Early life and education 
During his childhood, Watson had a strong interest in art. In middle school, Watson began filming comedy videos of himself and his friends to upload to the then emerging video website YouTube. Throughout his teenage years, he would continue to produce his own content which primarily consisted of sketch comedy, music videos, and animations.

Watson graduated high school from Charleston County School of The Arts in 2014. He attended the University of South Carolina and pursued a degree in business before dropping out after his first year and moving to Los Angeles to pursue a career in sketch comedy and video editing instead.

Career

Early years (2008–2015) 
Watson began creating videos in 2008 on his channel Formatt24, where he and his cousin Forest created various sketches. The channel ceased uploading in 2010. In August 2014, Watson began uploading sketches on a new channel called Kids w/ Problems, which would lead him to collaborate with LA-based sketch comedy and music channel Cyndago. After finishing his first year of college at The University of South Carolina, Watson moved to Los Angeles in July 2015 to pursue a career in sketch comedy, while also editing videos for the popular YouTuber Markiplier. He lived with fellow comedians Ryan Magee and Daniel Kyre. Watson would later depart Kids w/ Problems and officially join Cyndago on August 10, 2015. The group disbanded one month later following the sudden death of fellow Cyndago member Daniel Kyre. Following these events, Watson returned to Kids w/ Problems with Magee as a permanent co-host.

In 2016, Watson, as well as fellow editor Ryan Magee, stopped working for Fischbach. In a Facebook post, Fischbach stated that the primary reason was that it "was difficult to keep the work and the friendship separate".

SuperMega and continued growth (2016–present) 
On April 12, 2016, Watson and Magee started their own variety comedy channel, SuperMega. SuperMega consists of Let's Plays, sketch comedy, music videos, and a podcast.<ref
 name="Interview with EUPHORIA."></ref> The duo moved in together to an apartment in Glendale, California, where they spent their days developing the beginning of the channel. Shortly after the channel's conception, the duo started SuperMegaCast, an hour long free-form comedy podcast where the two converse and joke together. In the summer of 2016, Watson and Magee joined Game Grumps, where they produced and edited videos for the channel, and occasionally appeared as guests. While working for Game Grumps, Watson and Magee continued to grow SuperMega during their free time, producing comedy videos and collaborating with many creators, such as Finn Wolfhard, OneyPlays, Ian Hecox, Jacksepticeye, Ninja Sex Party, and several others.

On May 3, 2019, the duo left Game Grumps to focus solely on SuperMega. In July 2019, a 2016 video in which Watson and Magee play Pokémon Go at Area 51 went viral after memes surrounding the Storm Area 51 Facebook event became popular. Watson and Magee continued to grow their brand, eventually moving into their own office space dubbed The SuperMegaPlex, launching a merchandise operation, and growing their podcast. In 2017, SuperMega expanded the scope of their comedy career to include SuperMega LIVE!, an improv comedy show where they go up in front of a crowd to hang out, tell stories, and do challenges to entertain their fans. The duo performed shows across the United States and Canada, going on to perform in the 2019 Just for Laughs comedy festival.

In 2018, Watson and Magee launched a SuperMega Patreon page, which garnered over 5,000 patrons on launch day, making it one of the most successful launches in Patreon's history.

In 2021, Martins Motorsports announced a partnership with Watson and Magee's channel SuperMega, with the duo specifically serving as the primary sponsor of the No. 44 Chevrolet Camaro. The No. 44 Camaro sported SuperMega colors and imagery during the Memorial Day racetrack activities.

Watson and Magee published and released a comedy book, SuperMega Saves The Troops, on December 7, 2021. They stated they have two sequels planned and in the works.

On May 14, 2022, Watson had a boxing match in iDubbbz's Creator Clash charity event, losing his match against Nathan "Dad" Barnatt in 22 seconds by TKO.

Podcast 
The SuperMegaCast is a weekly podcast done by Matt and Ryan, consisting of them talking about current events, recent movies and video games, and stories from their lives. The podcast also frequently hosts guests ranging from close friends and other YouTubers, to artists and celebrities like George Clanton and Max Stanley. SuperMegaCast is currently the longest running series on the channel, at over 300 episodes.

Watson himself has featured on a wide array of podcasts, such as comedian Brandon Wardell's podcast Yeah, But Still (2 episodes), Chuckle Sandwich (2 episodes), Cr1TiKaL's The Official Podcast, Podcast About List, the Misfits Podcast, Cold Ones, George Clanton's The Big Stream, and more.

Music 

Since 2014, Watson has released various tracks and music videos, mainly consisting of comedic style. While quarantined during the COVID-19 pandemic, Watson produced his first non-comedy EP, Ouch!, for which he did the instruments, vocals, mixing, and production. On release, The EP's trending spot on Twitter competed for No. 1 with Big Sean's latest album, Detroit 2, due to SuperMega fans spamming the platform with support. Since the release of Ouch!, Watson has released two singles, Bored, for which he directed and produced a music video with fellow director Tucker Prescott, and Monopoly. He continues to post tracks with either a comedic undertone, a serious nature, or sometimes both. In a review by Nicholas Gaudet of Music Talkers, Gaudet praised Bored for its use of jazzy chords, synths, and low bass; as well as stating that it "feels much more confident in its identity" in comparison to Ouch!. Gaudet would later praise Watson's Monopoly for its similar use of a lo-fi style and jazz chords.

In 2022, he released his debut album See You There and went on his first solo music tour. Three singles were released ahead of the album, Ring Pop featuring Atlanta rapper Father, Balance and Starstud featuring Sarah Bonito of British indie band Kero Kero Bonito.

In an interview with EUPHORIA, Matt Watson listed My Bloody Valentine, Cocteau Twins, Negative Gemini, Puzzle, and Tyler, the Creator's Flower Boy as influences on his music.

Lazy Eye (2019–2020) 
In 2019 Watson founded the art collective and production company, Lazy Eye. Working with close friends and brother trio Carson, Jackson, and Harrison Tucker, the group produced music videos and clothing. The first video, directed by Watson and Carson Tucker, was for Canadian rapper Freddie Dredd's single Cha Cha, which has gone on to receive over 16 million views. The group produced more music videos for artists such as Slater from the Vada Vada label and Wondha Mountain from Drain Gang. Watson continued to direct music videos with the Tucker brothers until late 2020 when he departed the group to focus on other projects. Carson and Harrison continue to produce under the Lazy Eye name.

Discography

Albums

Singles and EPs

As featured artist

Filmography

Music videos

Television

References

External links
 

1996 births
21st-century American comedians
21st-century American male musicians
American music video directors
American podcasters
American sketch comedians
American YouTubers
Comedians from Los Angeles County
Comedians from South Carolina
Comedy YouTubers
English-language YouTube channels
Gaming-related YouTube channels
Gaming YouTubers
Living people
Music YouTubers
Musicians from Charleston, South Carolina
Musicians from Los Angeles
Video game commentators
YouTube podcasters